Volleyball is an indoor team sport.

Volleyball may also refer to:
 Beach volleyball, an outdoor pairs team game
 Volleyball (ball), the ball used in volleyball
 Volleyball (video game), a video game for the Nintendo Entertainment System
 A game similar to standard volleyball, see Volleyball variations
 Volleying a ball, a maneuver used in several games using balls:
 Volley (association football)
 Volley (tennis)
 The bullet used in a volley gun
 "Volleyball", an episode of the animated series Steven Universe Future